Hongyuan may refer to:

Hongyuan County (红原县), Sichuan
Hongyuan, Jiangxi (洪源镇), town in Fuliang County
Hongyuan Securities (宏源证劵), securities firm headquartered in Ürümqi
Guangdong Hongyuan F.C. (广东宏远足球俱乐部), Chinese football club